Pat Flynn may refer to:

Pat Flynn (musician) (born 1952), guitarist, singer, and songwriter
Pat Flynn (footballer) (born 1985), Irish former defender
Pat Flynn (tennis) (born 1968), Australian tennis player

See also
Patrick Flynn (disambiguation)